Kim Sung-gan (November 17, 1912 – May 19, 1984) was a South Korean footballer. Born in Pyongyang (known at the time as "Heijō"), he played for Japan national team in 1940. He died on May 29, 1984 in a traffic collision.

National team statistics

References

External links
 
 Japan National Football Team Database
 Japan Football Association official website

1912 births
1984 deaths
Japanese footballers
South Korean footballers
Japan international footballers
Zainichi Korean people
Association football forwards